The QSW-06 (officially translated in pinyin as Wēishēng Shǒu Qiāng, literally 'Minimal noise handgun') (also sometimes referred to as the Type 06) is a suppressed semi-automatic pistol in limited use with the People's Liberation Army (PLA) and various Chinese police departments. The QSW-06 is based on the QSZ-92 semi-automatic service pistol and is designed to replace the aging QSW-67 silent pistol.

Development
After nearly four decades of successful service, the Type 67 suppressed pistol was beginning to show its age. Issues surrounding the life of its integral suppressor, its low magazine capacity and overall performance had started becoming an issue. Soon trials for a replacement had begun starting in January 2002 after it was found that the QSZ-92s rotating barrel system was not suitable for a suppressor. Reviewing two different pistol designs and fifteen different suppressor designs, eventually one suppressor and one pistol were selected for further testing after a thorough review by firearms experts and the PLA. Eight months later a design was agreed on which would then go on to production and by December 2005 the design had been finalised and production began in early 2006 after going under a series of trials including ones performed in arctic, arid and normal weather conditions.

Design details
The QSW-06 is a polymer framed, short recoil operated, semi-automatic pistol that shares its development history with the QSZ-92 pistol and externally the two pistols are similar in appearance and share 60% of the same components but internally there are many differences between the two pistols. The most notable of these differences is, that while both pistols use a short recoil operation, the QSW-06 uses a non-rotating barrel lock as opposed to the QSZ-92 and its rotating barrel. The QSW-06 is chambered for DCV05 5.8 X 21mm subsonic round which creates less noise compared to standard pistol rounds. The QSW-06 is also capable of firing the standard PLA pistol round, the DAP92 5.8 x 21mm as well. The QSW-06 uses a double-column, staggered-feed, twenty-round magazine as opposed to the QSZ-92's fifteen-round magazine. A rail has been placed under the barrel and various sights, flashlights and other accessories may be attached. Most importantly, the QSW-06 comes with a detachable suppressor that may be screwed onto the barrel.

See also
QSZ-92

References

External links
 Sinodefence report

Semi-automatic pistols of the People's Republic of China
5.8 mm firearms